Indian Creek is an unincorporated community in southern Brown County in west-central Texas. According to the Handbook of Texas, there were no population estimates available for the community in 2000. It is located within the Brownwood, Texas micropolitan area.

History
Indian Creek was named for its position along the banks of Indian Creek. A post office was established at Indian Creek in 1876 in Francis Harris' general store. There were two stores, a cotton gin, and a blacksmith shop in the community in 1879. There were only two businesses and a church serving 60 residents in 1945. The population dropped to 28 in 1988 and there was no population in 2000. The community continued to be listed on county highway maps, as well as its cemetery located 3 miles north.

Geography

Education
In 1876, Indian Creek's first school was built on Tom McAden's pasture. It continued to operate in 1945. It then joined the Brookesmith Independent School District in 1948-49. The old ruins of the first school remain in the community today. It continues to be served by Brookesmith ISD today.

Howard Payne University was started in Indian Creek in 1889, but later relocated to Brownwood.

Notable person
Katherine Anne Porter, writer and political activist

References

Unincorporated communities in Texas
Unincorporated communities in Brown County, Texas